County of Hawke was a 19th-century parliamentary electorate in what is now the Hawke's Bay Region of New Zealand in the 2nd New Zealand Parliament in 1860.

History

In 1858 the General Assembly made some significant changes to electoral boundaries and increased parliamentary representation from 37 members to 41. One of the changes meant the  electorate was split into its two separate components (with both  and County of Hawke expanding inland into previously unincorporated areas).

The second Parliament was dissolved on 5 November, and FitzGerald did not seek election to the new Parliament. He had been elected Superintendent of the new Hawke's Bay Province in 1859. He moved to Queensland, Australia in 1862.

In 1861, the new Napier seat was formed in Hawke's Bay.

Members

References

Historical electorates of New Zealand
Politics of the Hawke's Bay Region
1858 establishments in New Zealand
1860 disestablishments in New Zealand